USS Nicholson (Destroyer No. 52/DD-52) was an  built for the United States Navy before the American entry into World War I. The ship was the second U.S. Navy vessel named in honor of five members of the Nicholson family who rendered distinguished service in the American Revolutionary War, the War of 1812, and the American Civil War: brothers James, Samuel, and John Nicholson; William Nicholson, son of John; and James W. Nicholson, grandson of Samuel.

Nicholson was laid down by William Cramp & Sons of Philadelphia in September 1913 and launched in August 1914. She was armed with four  guns and had eight 21 inch (533 mm) torpedo tubes.

After her April 1915 commissioning, Nicholson sailed off the east coast and in the Caribbean. After the United States entered World War I in April 1917, Nicholson was sent overseas to patrol the Irish Sea out of Queenstown, Ireland. In November, Nicholson and another US destroyer, were responsible for sinking German submarine , the first submarine taken by US forces during the war.

Upon returning to the United States after the war, Nicholson was placed in reduced commission in November 1919. She was decommissioned at Philadelphia in May 1922. She was struck from the Naval Vessel Register in January 1936 and sold for scrapping in June.

Design and construction
Construction of the vessel was awarded to William Cramp & Sons of Philadelphia which laid down her keel on 8 September 1913, the same date as of sister ship . On 19 August 1914, Nicholson was launched by sponsor Mrs. Charles T. Taylor. The ship was the second US Navy ship named after five members of the Nicholson family who gave distinguished service in the American Revolutionary War, the War of 1812, and the American Civil War.

Nicholson had two Zoelly steam turbines that drove her two screw propellers, and an additional pair triple-expansion steam engines, each connected to one of the propeller shafts, for cruising purposes.

Nicholson was also equipped with eight  torpedo tubes. The General Board of the United States Navy had called for two anti-aircraft guns for the O'Brien-class ships, as well as provisions for laying up to 36 floating mines. From sources, it is unclear if these recommendations were followed for Nicholson or any of the other ships of the class.

World War I
Nicholson was commissioned into the United States Navy on 30 April 1915. After a shakedown cruise in the North Atlantic, Nicholson operated in the Caribbean and along the east coast until early 1917.

The destroyers arrived at Queenstown, Ireland, 24 May for duty in the war zone.

In mid-October, Nicholson was part of the destroyer escort, for the eastbound convoy HS 14. At 0850, an SOS was received from SS J. L. Luckenbach, traveling independently some  ahead of the convoy. J. L. Luckenbach was equipped with guns of her own, but they were outranged by the pair of  deck guns on her attacker, U-62. By the time Nicholson arrived on the scene at about 1230, U-62 had been shelling J. L. Luckenbach for over three hours. Despite many rounds fired, only about a dozen had hit the American steamer; some of the hits, however, had ignited J. L. Luckenbachs cargo of cotton. Nicholson trained her  guns on the U-boat and, by the time her gunners had fired a second round, U-62 submerged and disappeared. The destroyer transferred a damage control party aboard J. L. Luckenbach which helped extinguish the fire and repair some of the damages to the ship. A few hours later, J. L. Luckenbach and Nicholson  joined and rejoined the convoy, respectively.

Sinking of U-58

The following month, Nicholson had a more successful encounter with a U-boat. Operating as the destroyer division's flagship, Nicholson - under the command of Lieutenant Commander Frank D. Berrien - and her group had joined the eastbound convoy OQ 20 on the afternoon of 17 November. At about 1615, Fanning was steaming to her position at the rear of the eight-ship convoy when her lookouts spotted a periscope just ahead. The periscope belonged to U-58 under the command of Kapitänleutnant Gustav Amberger, who was lining up a torpedo shot on the British steamer SS Welshman.

While Fanning circled around and dropped a depth charge on the spot where the periscope had been seen, Nicholson, which had raced through the convoy, dropped another in nearly the same location; both were to good effect. The two depth charges knocked out the  electric motor that powered U-58s  diving planes, making the vessel unmanageable. U-58 broached the surface momentarily and Fanning dropped another trio of depth charges over the submarine. Amberger ordered the ballast tanks blown and the submarine slowly rose to the surface, stabilizing on the surface with her bow pointing down. The submarines' four officers and 35 men evacuated U-58 and surrendered to Fanning at 16:28, but not before opening the sea valves to allow the U-boat to sink. One of U-58s crewmen drowned before reaching Fanning, while another died of a heart attack after he was brought aboard the destroyer.

An official account of the sinking was released to the press on 29 December, and Fanning and Nicholson shared credit for what The Washington Post in a contemporary news account called the "first U-Boat prize of the U.S." during the war; later works still credit the pair of destroyers with the US Navy's first U-Boat kill.

In February 1918, Nicholson transferred to Brest where she escorted convoys along the French coast. In early September 1918, Nicholson was one of six destroyers escorting a westbound pair of US Navy transports,  and Mount Vernon. Mount Vernon safely made it back to Brest with the loss of 37 crewmen out of the 1,450 passengers and crew on board.

Postwar period
Following the signing of the Armistice on 11 November, which ended all fighting, Nicholson remained in French waters. After arriving at New York on 10 January 1919, Nicholson resumed operations along the east coast until placed in reserve at Philadelphia on 27 November.

In July 1920, she was assigned the hull code of DD-52 under the US Navy's alphanumeric classification system. In May 1921, Nicholson was reactivated with a reduced complement. She remained active for about a year, until she was decommissioned at Philadelphia on 26 May 1922. The ship was struck from the Naval Vessel Register on 7 January 1936, and on 30 June was sold for scrapping.

References

Notes

Bibliography

External links

O'Brien-class destroyers
Ships built by William Cramp & Sons
1914 ships
World War I destroyers of the United States